

Events
Giraut de Calanso wrote , a planh for Ferdinand, infante of Castile

Births
 Busiri (died 1294), Egyptian poet

Deaths

13th-century poetry
Poetry